Breier is a surname. Notable people with the surname include:

Benjamin Breier (born 1971), American health care chief executive
Kimberly Breier (born 1972), American diplomat
Pascal Breier (born 1992), German footballer

See also
Breyer (disambiguation)